A macromolecule is a very large molecule important to biophysical processes, such as a protein or nucleic acid. It is composed of thousands of covalently bonded atoms. Many macromolecules are polymers of smaller molecules called monomers. The most common macromolecules in biochemistry are biopolymers (nucleic acids, proteins, and carbohydrates) and large non-polymeric molecules such as lipids, nanogels and macrocycles. Synthetic fibers and experimental materials such as carbon nanotubes are also examples of macromolecules.

Definition

The term macromolecule (macro- + molecule) was coined by Nobel laureate Hermann Staudinger in the 1920s, although his first relevant publication on this field only mentions high molecular compounds (in excess of 1,000 atoms). At that time the term polymer, as introduced by Berzelius in 1832, had a different meaning from that of today: it simply was another form of isomerism for example with benzene and acetylene and had little to do with size.

Usage of the term to describe large molecules varies among the disciplines. For example, while biology refers to macromolecules as the four large molecules comprising living things, in chemistry, the term may refer to aggregates of two or more molecules held together by intermolecular forces rather than covalent bonds but which do not readily dissociate.

According to the standard IUPAC definition, the term macromolecule as used in polymer science refers only to a single molecule. For example, a single polymeric molecule is appropriately described as a "macromolecule" or "polymer molecule" rather than a "polymer," which suggests a substance composed of macromolecules.

Because of their size, macromolecules are not conveniently described in terms of stoichiometry alone. The structure of simple macromolecules, such as homopolymers, may be described in terms of the individual monomer subunit and total molecular mass. Complicated biomacromolecules, on the other hand, require multi-faceted structural description such as the hierarchy of structures used to describe proteins. In British English, the word "macromolecule" tends to be called "high polymer".

Properties

Macromolecules often have unusual physical properties that do not occur for smaller molecules.

Another common macromolecular property that does not characterize smaller molecules is their relative insolubility in water and similar solvents, instead forming colloids. Many require salts or particular ions to dissolve in water. Similarly, many proteins will denature if the solute concentration of their solution is too high or too low.

High concentrations of macromolecules in a solution can alter the rates and equilibrium constants of the reactions of other macromolecules, through an effect known as macromolecular crowding. This comes from macromolecules excluding other molecules from a large part of the volume of the solution, thereby increasing the effective concentrations of these molecules.

Linear biopolymers 

All living organisms are dependent on three essential biopolymers for their biological functions: DNA, RNA and proteins. Each of these molecules is required for life since each plays a distinct, indispensable role in the cell. The simple summary is that DNA makes RNA, and then RNA makes proteins.

DNA, RNA, and proteins all consist of a repeating structure of related building blocks (nucleotides in the case of DNA and RNA, amino acids in the case of proteins). In general, they are all unbranched polymers, and so can be represented in the form of a string. Indeed, they can be viewed as a string of beads, with each bead representing a single nucleotide or amino acid monomer linked together through covalent chemical bonds into a very long chain.

In most cases, the monomers within the chain have a strong propensity to interact with other amino acids or nucleotides. In DNA and RNA, this can take the form of Watson-Crick base pairs (G-C and A-T or A-U), although many more complicated interactions can and do occur.

Structural features 

Because of the double-stranded nature of DNA, essentially all of the nucleotides take the form of Watson-Crick base pairs between nucleotides on the two complementary strands of the double-helix.

In contrast, both RNA and proteins are normally single-stranded. Therefore, they are not constrained by the regular geometry of the DNA double helix, and so fold into complex three-dimensional shapes dependent on their sequence. These different shapes are responsible for many of the common properties of RNA and proteins, including the formation of specific binding pockets, and the ability to catalyse biochemical reactions.

DNA is optimised for encoding information 
DNA is an information storage macromolecule that encodes the complete set of instructions (the genome) that are required to assemble, maintain, and reproduce every living organism.

DNA and RNA are both capable of encoding genetic information, because there are biochemical mechanisms which read the information coded within a DNA or RNA sequence and use it to generate a specified protein. On the other hand, the sequence information of a protein molecule is not used by cells to functionally encode genetic information.

DNA has three primary attributes that allow it to be far better than RNA at encoding genetic information. First, it is normally double-stranded, so that there are a minimum of two copies of the information encoding each gene in every cell. Second, DNA has a much greater stability against breakdown than does RNA, an attribute primarily associated with the absence of the 2'-hydroxyl group within every nucleotide of DNA. Third, highly sophisticated DNA surveillance and repair systems are present which monitor damage to the DNA and repair the sequence when necessary. Analogous systems have not evolved for repairing damaged RNA molecules. Consequently, chromosomes can contain many billions of atoms, arranged in a specific chemical structure.

Proteins are optimised for catalysis 

Proteins are functional macromolecules responsible for catalysing the biochemical reactions that sustain life. Proteins carry out all functions of an organism, for example photosynthesis, neural function, vision, and movement.

The single-stranded nature of protein molecules, together with their composition of 20 or more different amino acid building blocks, allows them to fold in to a vast number of different three-dimensional shapes, while providing binding pockets through which they can specifically interact with all manner of molecules. In addition, the chemical diversity of the different amino acids, together with different chemical environments afforded by local 3D structure, enables many proteins to act as enzymes, catalyzing a wide range of specific biochemical transformations within cells. In addition, proteins have evolved the ability to bind a wide range of cofactors and coenzymes, smaller molecules that can endow the protein with specific activities beyond those associated with the polypeptide chain alone.

RNA is multifunctional 
RNA is multifunctional, its primary function is to encode proteins, according to the instructions within a cell’s DNA. They control and regulate many aspects of protein synthesis in eukaryotes.

RNA encodes genetic information that can be translated into the amino acid sequence of proteins, as evidenced by the messenger RNA molecules present within every cell, and the RNA genomes of a large number of viruses. The single-stranded nature of RNA, together with tendency for rapid breakdown and a lack of repair systems means that RNA is not so well suited for the long-term storage of genetic information as is DNA.

In addition, RNA is a single-stranded polymer that can, like proteins, fold into a very large number of three-dimensional structures. Some of these structures provide binding sites for other molecules and chemically-active centers that can catalyze specific chemical reactions on those bound molecules. The limited number of different building blocks of RNA (4 nucleotides vs >20 amino acids in proteins), together with their lack of chemical diversity, results in catalytic RNA (ribozymes) being generally less-effective catalysts than proteins for most biological reactions.

The Major Macromolecules:

Branched biopolymers 

Carbohydrate macromolecules (polysaccharides) are formed from polymers of monosaccharides. Because monosaccharides have multiple functional groups, polysaccharides can form linear polymers (e.g. cellulose) or complex branched structures (e.g. glycogen). Polysaccharides perform numerous roles in living organisms, acting as energy stores (e.g. starch) and as structural components (e.g. chitin in arthropods and fungi). Many carbohydrates contain modified monosaccharide units that have had functional groups replaced or removed.

Polyphenols consist of a branched structure of multiple phenolic subunits. They can perform structural roles (e.g. lignin) as well as roles as secondary metabolites involved in signalling, pigmentation and defense.

Synthetic macromolecules 
Some examples of macromolecules are synthetic polymers (plastics, synthetic fibers, and synthetic rubber), graphene, and carbon nanotubes. Polymers may be prepared from inorganic matter as well as for instance in inorganic polymers and geopolymers. The incorporation of inorganic elements enables the tunability of properties and/or responsive behavior as for instance in smart inorganic polymers.

See also
 List of biophysically important macromolecular crystal structures
 Small molecule
 Soft matter

References

External links
 Synopsis of Chapter 5, Campbell & Reece, 2002
 Lecture notes on the structure and function of macromolecules
 Several (free) introductory macromolecule related internet-based courses 
 Giant Molecules! by Ulysses Magee, ISSA Review Winter 2002–2003, . Cached HTML version of a missing PDF file. Retrieved March 10, 2010. The article is based on the book, Inventing Polymer Science: Staudinger, Carothers, and the Emergence of Macromolecular Chemistry by Yasu Furukawa.

 
Molecular physics
Biochemistry
Polymer chemistry
Polymers